Svetlana Alexandrovna Pletneva (also spelled Pletnyeva and Pletnyova ) (April 1, 1926 in Vyatka- 20 November 2008 in Moscow) was a Russian and Soviet archaeologist and historian. Like Lev Gumilev, she was a student of Mikhail Artamonov, although she discarded many of the former's theories as mere speculations. She won the USSR State Prize in 1986.

Pletneva is the author of numerous books on Eurasian nomads, particularly the Khazars.

Honours and awards 
State Prize of the USSR
Order of the Badge of Honour
Medal "For Labour Valour"
Medal "For Distinguished Labour"

External links
Pletneva's page on the Institute for Archeology website 

1926 births
2008 deaths
Khazar studies
20th-century Russian historians
Soviet historians
Soviet women historians
Russian archaeologists
Russian women archaeologists
Moscow State University alumni
20th-century Russian women writers
Soviet archaeologists
Rossiyskaya arkheologiya editors